Gates to Purgatory is the debut studio album by German heavy metal band Running Wild, released in 1984. It predates their piracy themes and has mostly satanically-influenced lyrics but also features songs with anarchic and libertarian (in the sense of European libertarianism) themes. It was in part of Gerald "Preacher" Warnecke's studies in theology. He left the band soon after the album's release to become a vicar.

The album has sold over 235,000 copies worldwide. The album was reissued in 2012 by Lemon Records, as well as in 2017 by Noise Records.

Track listing
All tracks written by Rolf Kasparek except where noted

 The bonus track "Walpurgis Night" cuts off very close to the end due to the condition of the master tape on most releases
 The 1991 Japanese release contains the 1985 album Branded and Exiled

Personnel
Rolf Kasparek – guitar, vocals
Gerald "Preacher" Warnecke – guitar
Stephan Boriss – bass
Wolfgang "Hasche" Hagemann – drums

Production
 Running Wild – producer, artwork
 Horst Müller – producer, recording
 D. Magnussen – photography

Cover versions
The sludge metal band Kingdom of Sorrow did a cover of the song "Soldiers of Hell" in their album Behind the Blackest Tears.

References

 

1984 debut albums
Running Wild (band) albums
Noise Records albums